Lewis Frederick Ayres III (December 28, 1908 – December 30, 1996) was an American actor whose film and television career spanned 65 years. He is best known for starring as German soldier Paul Bäumer in the film All Quiet on the Western Front (1930) and for playing Dr. Kildare in nine films.  He was nominated for an Academy Award for Best Actor for his performance in Johnny Belinda (1948).

Early life and career
Ayres was born in Minneapolis to Irma Bevernick and Louis Ayres, who divorced when he was four. Louis, an amateur musician and court reporter, remarried soon afterwards.

As a teen, he and his mother moved with his step-father, William Gilmore, and half brother and sister to San Diego, California.

Leaving high school before graduating, he started a small band which traveled to Mexico. He returned months later to pursue an acting career, but continued working full-time as a musician. He played banjo and guitar for big bands, including the Henry Halstead Orchestra. He recorded one of the earliest Vitaphone movie shorts called Carnival Night in Paris (Warner Brothers, 1927).

Ayres wrote, "I was a member of Henry Halstead's orchestra in 1927 at the Mission Beach Ballroom in San Diego, California for the summer. My instruments were tenor banjo, long-neck banjo and guitar. After a hiatus, I rejoined Mr. Halstead with a new group, including Phil Harris, on New Year's Eve the same year for the opening night of the Beverly Wilshire Hotel, a memorable occasion."

He left a national tour to pursue a career as an actor full-time.

Career
Ayres was discovered at a night club by talent agent Ivan Kahn. He was cast to play opposite Greta Garbo in The Kiss (1929), but it was his leading role in the original version of All Quiet on the Western Front (1930) that made him a star, secured him a contract with Universal—and made him a conscientious objector to World War II.

He made a number of mostly forgotten B movies for Universal, with the exception of Iron Man (1931), with Jean Harlow. His most successful movies at this time were those he made on loan to other studios, including The Doorway to Hell (1930) with James Cagney in a supporting role, and as Janet Gaynor's   leading man in both State Fair (1933) and Servants' Entrance (1934), which featured a combination of live action and Walt Disney animation in a musical dream sequence, both for Fox Films.

Ayres left Universal to sign with Fox Films. In 1934, Fox listed him as one of its second tier stars.

He moved to poverty row studio Republic Pictures to pursue a second career as a director, including the film Hearts in Bondage (1936), starring James Dunn and Mae Clarke. He moved to Paramount Pictures before finally being signed to MGM in 1938. At this time, he was loaned from Paramount to play the role of Ned in Holiday (1938).

The role earned him considerable critical attention, including interest from MGM to put him under contract specifically for the role of Dr. James Kildare in an upcoming film series. Ayres played the role in nine films from 1938 to 1942 (and again in a 1950s radio series) while also appearing in light comedies for MGM, including Spring Madness and Rich Man, Poor Girl (both 1938), The Ice Follies of 1939 (1939), and Fingers at the Window (1942).  His final film as Dr. Kildare, Born to Be Bad, was re-edited after he was drafted and declared himself a conscientious objector in March 1942.

He returned to acting in the films The Dark Mirror (1946) with Olivia de Havilland and The Unfaithful (1947) with Ann Sheridan. For his role in Johnny Belinda (1948) he received an Academy Award nomination for Best Actor, while co-star Jane Wyman won Best Actress.

Ayres gradually moved to television, appearing in several anthology series in   guest roles. In the summer of 1958, he hosted eleven original episodes of a CBS Western anthology television series called Frontier Justice, a production of Dick Powell's Four Star Television. He was offered the part of Dr. Kildare in an NBC series but his prescient request that the show have no cigarette advertising led to the offer being withdrawn, and the part going, in 1961, to Richard Chamberlain. He appeared as the vice-president in Advise & Consent (1962), and in The Carpetbaggers (1964), but he was by then primarily a television actor, with only occasional film work.

For a guest role in Kung Fu ("The Vanishing Image", 1974) he was nominated for an Emmy.

His documentary film Altars of the World (1976), based on a series of documentaries he made titled Altars of the East (1956), brought his Eastern philosophical beliefs to the screen and earned him critical acclaim and a Golden Globe Award for best documentary in 1977.

Ayres guest-starred in an episode of The Bionic Woman ("Doomsday is Tomorrow", 1977) as Dr. Elijah Cooper, an elderly nuclear scientist who attempts to blackmail the world into peace.

In 1985, he was cast in his first series as a regular cast member, as the father of Robert Wagner in the short-lived series Lime Street. His last role was in the made-for-TV film Hart to Hart: Crimes of the Heart (1994), also starring Wagner.

World War II conscientious objector and medic
In March 1942, Ayres was identified as a 4E conscientious objector and sent to a CO camp. As expected, the announcement that a Hollywood actor objected to the war was a major source of public outcry and debate.

Within a month it was determined that he had initially requested to be A-O-1, so that he could serve as a non-combat medic. However, the military's policy that servicemen cannot request, or be guaranteed, where they will serve, forced him to request a 4E status. The U.S. military confirmed that they would place him as a medic and in April 1942, his status was changed. He enlisted in the United States Army on May 18, 1942.

He served as a first aid instructor in the United States Army before requesting a drop in rank in order to serve as a medic and chaplain's assistant in the Pacific. He was one of 16 medics who arrived under fire during the invasion of Leyte to set up evacuation hospitals, and there he provided care to soldiers and civilians in the Philippines and New Guinea. He donated all the money he had earned as a serviceman to the American Red Cross.

Serving for three and a half years in the Medical Corps, he was awarded three battle stars. After the war, he resumed his career and made scores of movies, but never reached the peak of his early Hollywood stardom, except when he was nominated for an Oscar.

Personal life

Ayres was married three times. First to actress Lola Lane from 1931 until 1933, although they were separated much of that period. He met actress Ginger Rogers while starring in the film Don't Bet on Love in 1933 and they wed 1934.  They separated in 1936 and divorced in March 1940. His third marriage, to Diana Hall, lasted from 1964 until his death in 1996. Their son Justin was born in 1968.

Death and legacy
In 1960, Lew Ayres was inducted into the Hollywood Walk of Fame with two stars. His motion pictures star is located at 6385 Hollywood Boulevard while his radio star is located at 1724 Vine Street.

Ayres died on December 30, 1996. His body was buried under a simple headstone at Westwood Memorial Park in Westwood, Los Angeles.

Filmography

 The Sophomore (1929) as Sophomore Fraternity Brother (uncredited)
 Big News (1929) as Copyboy (uncredited)
 The Kiss (1929) as Pierre
 All Quiet on the Western Front (1930) as Paul
 Common Clay (1930) as Hugh Fullerton
 The Doorway to Hell (1930) as Louie
 East Is West (1930) as Billy Benson
 Many a Slip (1931) as Jerry Brooks
 Iron Man (1931) as Kid Mason
 Up for Murder (1931) as Robert Marshall
 The Spirit of Notre Dame (1931) as Bucky O'Brien
 Heaven on Earth (1931) as States
 The Impatient Maiden (1932) as Dr. Myron Brown
 The Cohens and Kellys in Hollywood (1932) as Himself
 Night World (1932) as Michael Rand
 Okay, America! (1932) as Larry Wayne
 State Fair (1933) as Pat Gilbert
 Don't Bet on Love (1933) as Bill McCaffery
 My Weakness (1933) as Ronnie Gregory
 Cross Country Cruise (1934) as Norman Winthrop
 Let's Be Ritzy (1934) as Jimmy Sterling
 She Learned About Sailors (1934) as Larry Wilson
 Servants' Entrance (1934) as Erik Landstrom
 Lottery Lover (1935) as Cadet Frank Harrington
 Spring Tonic (1935) as Caleb Enix
 The Silk Hat Kid (1935) as Eddie Howard
 The Leathernecks Have Landed (1936) as Woodruff 'Woody' Davis
 Panic on the Air (1936) as Jerry Franklin
 Shakedown (1936) as Bob Sanderson
 Lady Be Careful (1936) as Chester aka Dynamite
 Murder with Pictures (1936) as Kent Murdock
 The Crime Nobody Saw (1937) as Nick Milburn
 The Last Train from Madrid (1937) as Bill Dexter
 Hold 'em Navy (1937) as Tommy Graham
 Scandal Street (1938) as Joe McKnight
 King of the Newsboys (1938) as Jerry Flynn
 Holiday (1938) as Ned Seton
 Rich Man, Poor Girl (1938) as Henry Thayer
 Young Dr. Kildare (1938) as Dr. James Kildare
 Spring Madness (1938) as Sam Thatcher
 The Ice Follies of 1939 (1939) as Eddie Burgess
 Broadway Serenade (1939) as James Geoffrey Seymour
 Calling Dr. Kildare (1939) as Dr. James Kildare
 These Glamour Girls (1939) as Philip S. Griswold
 The Secret of Dr. Kildare (1939) as Dr. James 'Jimmy' Kildare
 Remember? (1939) as Sky Ames
 Dr. Kildare's Strange Case (1940) as Dr. James 'Jimmy' Kildare
 The Golden Fleecing  (1940) as Henry Twinkle
 Dr. Kildare Goes Home (1940) as Dr. James Kildare
 Dr. Kildare's Crisis (1940) as Dr. James 'Jimmy' Kildare
 Maisie Was a Lady (1941) as Bob Rawlston
 The People vs. Dr. Kildare (1941) as Dr. James Kildare
 Dr. Kildare's Wedding Day (1941) as Dr. James Kildare
 Dr. Kildare's Victory (1942) as Dr. James Kildare
 Fingers at the Window (1942) as Oliver Duffy
 The Dark Mirror (1946) as Dr. Scott Elliott
 The Unfaithful (1947) as Larry Hannaford
 The Way of Peace (1947, Short) as Narrator (voice)
 Johnny Belinda (1948) as Dr. Robert Richardson
 The Capture (1950) as Vanner
 New Mexico (1951) as Capt. Hunt
 No Escape (1953) as John Howard Tracy
 Donovan's Brain (1953) as Dr. Patrick Cory
 The Ford Show with Tennessee Ernie Ford (1958, TV Series) as Father John Gerald
 The DuPont Show with June Allyson (1960, TV series) as Howard Moon
 The Barbara Stanwyck Show (NBC, 1961, TV series) as Dr. Paul Harris
 Advise & Consent (1962) as the (U.S.) Vice President – Harley Hudson
 The Carpetbaggers (1964) as 'Mac' McAllister
 Gunsmoke (1967, TV series) as Cole in "The Prodigal"
 The Big Valley (1967–1968, TV series) as Jason Fleet / Sheriff Roy Kingston
 Hawaii Five-O (1968, TV series Pilot) as Governor Paul Jameson
 The Doris Day Show (1970, TV series) as William Tyler
 My Three Sons (1970, TV series) Professor Harper
 Earth II (1971, TV movie) as U.S. President Charles Carter Durant
 The Biscuit Eater (1972) as Mr. Ames
 The Man (1972) as U.S. Vice President Noah Calvin
 The Stranger (1973, TV movie) as Prof. Dylan MacAuley
 Battle for the Planet of the Apes (1973) as Mandemus
 Hawaii Five-O (1973, TV series) as Dr. Elias Haig in "Anybody Can Build a Bomb" (S6/Ep12)
 Hawkins (1973, TV series) in "Blood Feud" (S1/Ep4)
 The Questor Tapes (1974, TV Movie) as Vaslovik
 The Magician (1974, TV series) as Max Braden in "The Illusion Of The Evil Spikes"
 Heat Wave! (1974, TV Movie) as Dr. Grayson
 Columbo: Mind over Mayhem (NBC, 1974, TV Series) as Dr. Howard Nicholson
 Kung Fu (1972 TV Series) (ABC, 1974) as Beaumont. Nominated for an Emmy, Outstanding Single Performance by a Supporting Actor in a Comedy or Drama Series - 1975.
 Little House on the Prairie (NBC, 1976)
 The Bionic Woman (1977, TV Series) as Dr. Elijah Cooper
 The New Adventures of Wonder Woman (1977, TV series) as Dr. Kenneth Wilson
 The Mary Tyler Moore Show (1977, TV Series) as Doug Booth
 End of the World (1977) as Beckerman
 Damien: Omen II (1978) as Bill Atherton
 Battlestar Galactica: Saga of a Star World (1978) as Twelve Colonies President Adar
 Salem's Lot (1979, TV movie) as Jason Burke
Little House a new Beginning (1983) as Mr McCarey
 The World of Don Camillo (1984) as Doc
 Lime Street (1985–1986) as Henry Wade Culver
 The A-Team: The Grey Team (1986) as Bernie Greene 
 Highway to Heaven (1985–1989, TV Series) as Ivan Zelenka / Frank Worton / Harry Haynes

Radio
 Philip Morris Playhouse—episode Dark Victory (1952)
 The Story of Dr. Kildare (1949–1951 series)

See also
 List of actors with Academy Award nominations

References 

General sources
 Coffin, Lesley L. (2012). Lew Ayres: Hollywood's Conscientious Objector. Jackson: University Press of Mississippi. . .

External links

Classic Images
Photographs of Lew Ayres

1908 births
1996 deaths
20th-century American male actors
20th-century Lutherans
American conscientious objectors
American Lutherans
American male film actors
American male radio actors
American male television actors
Burials at Westwood Village Memorial Park Cemetery
California Republicans
Combat medics
Male actors from Minneapolis
Male actors from San Diego
Metro-Goldwyn-Mayer contract players
Military personnel from Minneapolis
United States Army personnel of World War II
United States Army soldiers
Universal Pictures contract players